Bent Jensen (born 21 May 1955) is a Danish equestrian. He competed in two events at the 1992 Summer Olympics.

References

External links
 

1955 births
Living people
American male equestrians
Danish male equestrians
Danish dressage riders
Olympic equestrians of Denmark
Equestrians at the 1992 Summer Olympics
Sportspeople from Copenhagen